Elina Siirala (born 27 October 1983) is a Finnish soprano. She is the founder and frontwoman for the English melodic metal band Angel Nation (formerly EnkElination) and the current female vocalist for the German symphonic metal/viking metal band Leaves' Eyes. Elina is the second cousin of Tuomas Holopainen, founder and keyboardist of Nightwish.

Career 

After completing a bachelor's degree in classical singing in Helsinki, Elina moved to London in 2008 to study contemporary vocals.

In 2011, she formed the melodic metal band EnkElination, the band name being a play on words featuring "enkeli", the Finnish word for "angel", and also her name "Elina" in the middle. In 2016 the band announced they would translate their name to "Angel Nation".

The new band name of Angel Nation was shortly followed on 12 April 2016 by the announcement of a new drummer Lucas Robert Williamson joining existing members Shadow on guitar and Julia on bass.

The band played several live shows both headlining venues such as the Camden Underworld and supporting larger bands, as well as festival appearances including Bloodstock Open Air in 2014 and Dames of Darkness in 2015. She came to the attention of Leaves' Eyes during one of those support slots, and in 2016 she was invited to join Leaves' Eyes to replace departing singer Liv Kristine.

In 2016 Elina toured the United States with Leaves Eyes.  In October 2016 she released the single "Do It Anyway" with her band Angel Nation via Nuclear Blast.  The single was accompanied by a video produced by Caz Reason and featured fellow band members Shadow, Julia and Lucas.

In 2017 Leaves Eyes announced another tour of the United States alongside Sabaton whilst Elina also returned to work on recordings for Angel Nation's second album "Aeon".  "Aeon" was released on 27 October 2017 with a small European tour announced alongside Elyose.

Discography

Angel Nation

Albums
Tears of Lust (2014)
Aeon (2017)
Antares (2022)

Singles
Do It Anyway (2016)

Music videos
Tears of Lust (2014)
Last Time Together (2015)
Do it Anyway (2016)
Burn the Witch (2017)

Leaves' Eyes

Albums
 Sign of the Dragonhead (2018)
 The Last Viking (2020)

EPs
Fires in the North (2016)
Black Butterfly (2019)

Music videos
Edge of Steel (2016)
Fires in the North (2016)
Sign of the Dragonhead (2017)
Across the Sky (2018)
Dark Love Empress (2020)
Chain of the Golden Horn (2020)
War of Kings (2020)

Guest performances

 Orden Ogan - Absolution for our final days (2022)

References

External links 

 

Women heavy metal singers
Finnish heavy metal singers
Finnish sopranos
Vocal coaches
Finnish expatriates in the United Kingdom
Living people
1983 births
21st-century Finnish women singers